Oxpark is a townland in the Barony of Ormond Lower, County Tipperary, Ireland. It is located north of Main Street Cloughjordan.

Historical structures

Cloughjordan House is an historic private residence within Oxpark. The present house comprises a central two storey five bay section flanked by two gable fronted sections. The grounds contain the remains of a moat and farm buildings from the 19th and 20th centuries. A business consisting of a cookery school, wedding venue, event destination and B & B accommodation operates from here. Historical records of the walled nursery garden have been transferred to the archives of the National Botanic Gardens (Ireland).

A sweathouse and fulacht fiadh were identified during excavations in 2006 prior to work commencing on development of the eco-village.

All that remains of Cloughjordan Fever hospital are a few stones accessed from the west side of the eco-village.

Recent developments

A community amphitheatre, created within the eco-village was opened by Michael D. Higgins, President of Ireland in April 2017.

References

Townlands of County Tipperary
Cloughjordan